The 1913 South Australian Football League season was the 37th season of the top-level Australian rules football competition in South Australia.

Ladder

1913 SAFL Finals

Week 3 (1913 SAFL Grand Final)

References 

SAFL
South Australian National Football League seasons